The Benny Award is bestowed on a New Zealand variety entertainer. It is presented annually by the Variety Artists Club of New Zealand, a non-for-profit organisation and showbusiness club, founded in 1966 and awarded to a variety performer who has achieved "A lifetime of excellence in their field of the performing arts".

Nominations

Nominations for the Benny Award are accepted from VAC members and the recipient decided upon by past Benny recipients, making its presentation recognition of the highest degree by the New Zealand entertainment industry.

Naming

The Benny Award was named after its first recipient, New Zealand variety performer Edgar Benyon (1902–1978) in 1969. The Benny statuette was designed and sculptured by magician Jon Zealando and features Greek muses Melpomene and Thalia, the traditional symbols of comedy and tragedy.

Recipients of the Benny Award include many New Zealand household names and figureheads of entertainment.

Recipients

References

External links 
 Variety Artists Club of New Zealand Website
 Video : Red Carpet TV at the 2018 Benny Awards
 Biographical Information about all Benny Winners
 2011 Benny Awards television coverage
 Max Cryer MBE presents the 2006 Benny to Alan Watson
 Max Cryer MBE presents the 2009 Benny to Eddie Low
 Max Cryer MBE presents 2010 Benny to Gary Daverne ONZM

Performing arts awards
Entertainment in New Zealand
Variety shows
Culture in Auckland
Awards established in 1969
1969 establishments in New Zealand
New Zealand awards